Apa local government area was first created on 23 March 1981. It became defunct on 31 December 1983, and was later re-created in August, 1991. The local government is located in the northwestern part of Makurdi, the capital of Benue State. It is bounded to the North by Agatu local government, to the East by Gwer West, to the South by Otukpo and to West by Omala local government area of Kogi State.

It has population of about 100,000 people with a population density of about 200,300 persons per km2. The inhabitants of the local government are predominantly Idoma and a few Igalas and other settlers.

The local government has 11 council wards namely, Ugbokpo, Edikwu I, Ikobi, Akpete, Oba, Iga, Oiji, Ojope, Igoro, Edikwu II and Auke.

Mineral resources found in the local government area are numerous and are awaiting exploitation. They are petroleum deposits at Okwiji and salt at Iga-Okpaya. Other minerals found in the local government are kaolin, limestone, gypsum, anhydride and natural gas. The local government also has agricultural products of commercial significance. This include yams, maize, guinea-corn, rice, soybeans, millet, beniseed, beans, groundnuts, bambara nuts, citrus fruits, mangoes, cashew, pineapple, guava, palm products, iron beans,  pepper and cassava. Of these, the local government council is one of the major producers of yams, pepper, melon, beniseed, maize, guinea-corn and cassava in the state.

These agricultural potentials are capable of conveniently supporting agro-allied industries like rice milling, palm kernel processing, garri processing lour milling, juice processing, bakery, oil mills, food processing, timber-lumbering and ceramic. An enabling environment already exists for investment in these areas with existing infrastructures like electricity supply available in the two major towns of Ugbokpo, the local government headquarters and Iga-Okpoya, and other places like Odugbo, Ebugodo, Oba, Obinda, Angwa and Ikampo. There is also pipe-borne water supply at Ugbokpo. The ever-flowing Ochekwu and Okpokwu streams run through the length of the local government area. These, no doubt are adequate sources of water supply for any industrial venture established in the local government area.

The people of the local government, in addition to farming, engage in trading. Markets located at Ugbokpo, Ikobi, Iga-Okpaya, Odugbo, Oiji, Ofoke, Oba Alifeti, Idada, Ojantela, Edikwu-Icho and Ogbobi are beehives of business activities on market days. Besides, these places are growing to renowned commercial centers consequently upon the daily business transactions that take place there.

As a positive step to boost commercial activities in the area, the local government council has gone into constructing feeder roads, drainages and culverts. This, no doubt, will go a long way to turning around the economy of the area. The aim is to transform Ugbokpo into a veritable local government council headquarters. Furthermore, the abundant forest resources prevalent in the local government area is boost to the growing timber business in the area.

References

Local Government Areas in Benue State